The Zilog Z180 eight-bit processor is a successor of the Z80 CPU. It is compatible with the large base of software written for the Z80. The Z180 family adds higher performance and integrated peripheral functions like clock generator, 16-bit counters/timers, interrupt controller, wait-state generators, serial ports and a DMA controller. It uses separate read and write strobes, sharing similar timings with the Z80 and Intel processors. The on-chip memory management unit (MMU) has the capability of addressing up to 1 MB of memory. It is possible to configure the Z180 to operate as the Hitachi HD64180.

Variants

Z80182
The Zilog Z80182, introduced in 1997, is an enhanced, faster version of the older Z80 and is part of the Z180 microprocessor family. It's nicknamed the Zilog Intelligent Peripheral Controller (ZIP). It's also fully static (the clock can be halted and no data in the registers will be lost) and has a low EMI option that reduces the slew rate of the outputs.

The Z80182 can operate at 33 MHz with an external oscillator for 5-volt operation, or at 20 MHz using the internal oscillator for 3.3-volt operation.

References

Further reading

External links
 
 
 
 

Zilog microprocessors
Computer-related introductions in 1992
8-bit microprocessors